Orange Township is one of thirteen townships in Noble County, Indiana. As of the 2010 census, its population was 3,911 and it contained 2,147 housing units.

History
Gene Stratton-Porter Cabin (Rome City, Indiana), also known as the Cabin at Wildflower Woods, was the lakeside home of author, nature photographer, naturalist, and silent movie-era producer Gene Stratton-Porter. The cabin was built in 1913 and was added to the National Register of Historic Places in 1974. The historic property, where Stratton-Porter lived until 1919, has been designated as the Gene Stratton-Porter State Historic Site. It is operated by the Indiana State Museum and Historic Sites and open to the public. Scenes from the 1927 movie based on Stratton-Porter's book, The Harvester, were filmed at Wildflower Woods in 1927.

Geography

Cities and towns
 Rome City
 Wolcottville (south side)

Unincorporated towns
 Brimfield at 
(This list is based on USGS data and may include former settlements.)

Education
Orange Township residents may obtain a free library card from the Kendallville Public Library in Kendallville.

References

External links
 Indiana Township Association
 United Township Association of Indiana

Townships in Noble County, Indiana
Townships in Indiana